Lovre Miloš (born 5 April 1994) is a retired Croatian water polo player for HAVK Mladost and the Croatian national team.

He participated at the 2019 World Championships.

See also
 List of World Aquatics Championships medalists in water polo

References

External links
 

1994 births
Living people
Croatian male water polo players
World Aquatics Championships medalists in water polo
Water polo players at the 2020 Summer Olympics
Olympic water polo players of Croatia